This is a list of notable Macedonian Turks.

Academia
Sadettin Dilbilgen, Ottoman and Turkish philatelist

Arts and literature
 
Yahya Kemal Beyatlı, Ottoman and Turkish poet and author
Alaettin Tahir, author, researcher and journalist
Avni Engüllü, poet, writer and politician

Business
Şarık Tara, billionaire; founder of Enka İnşaat ve Sanayi A.Ş.

Cinema and television
Filiz Ahmet, Macedonian and Turkish actress
Sabina Ajrula, actress
Pelin Akil, Turkish actress (maternally of Turkish Macedonian origin) 
Özgü Namal, Turkish actress (Turkish Macedonian father)  
Muhterem Nur, actress and pop singer 
Ertan Saban, actor
Erman Saban, actor
Elyesa Kaso, actor
Selahattin Bilal, actor
Mustafa Yaşar, actor
Bedia Begovska, actress
Leyla Sayar,  actress, author, ballerina, beauty queen, and singer (Turkish Macedonian father)
Attila Klinçe, actor

Military
Tekin Arıburun, chief commander of the Turkish Air Force
Huseyin Avni, commander of the 57th Infantry Regiment of the Ottoman Army at Gallipoli
Kâzım Dirik, officer of the Ottoman Army and a general of the Turkish Army
Naci Eldeniz, officer of the Ottoman Army, a general of the Turkish Army, and a politician of the Republic of Turkey
Akif Erdemgil, officer of the Ottoman Army and a general of the Turkish Army
Mehmet Suphi Kula, officer of the Ottoman Army and a general of the Turkish Army
Süleyman Sabri Pasha, officer of the Ottoman Army and a general of the Turkish Army
Tahsin Yazıcı, Turkish army officer
Hüseyin Avni Zaimler, officer of the Ottoman Army, a general of the Turkish Army, and a politician of the Republic of Turkey

Music
 
Selda Bağcan, Turkish singer (Turkish Macedonian father) 
Ajri Demirovski, singer 
Şebnem Ferah, Turkish singer (Turkish Macedonian parents) 
Mesut Kurtiş, singer
Sibel Redzep, Swedish singer
Usnija Redžepova, singer (Turkish mother)
Kevser Selimova, singer and musician

Politics
 
 
 
Tekin Arıburun, the last Turkish president to be born outside the territory of modern-day Turkey
Ali Rıza Efendi, father of Mustafa Kemal Atatürk (family from the Turkish Macedonian village of Kodžadžik)
Elvin Hasan, politician and government minister 
Enes Ibrahim, MP in the Assembly of the Republic of Macedonia (2014–present) 
Srgjan Kerim, diplomat and former President of the United Nations General Assembly
Ali Fethi Okyar, second Prime Minister of Turkey

Sports
 
 
Serdar Aziz, Turkish football player (Turkish Macedonian father)
Erol Bekir, Swedish football player 
Elif Elmas,  football player 
Ilami Halimi, football player
Adem İbrahimoğlu, Turkish football player
Semih Kaya, Turkish football player (Turkish Macedonian grandfather) 
Denis Mahmudov, football player 
Oktay Mahmuti, basketball coach
Emre Mor, Turkish football player (Turkish Macedonian mother)
Muarem Muarem, football player
Caner Osman, Turkish basketball coach (Turkish Macedonian father) 
Cedi Osman, basketball player
Yksel Osmanovski, Swedish football player
Erdal Rakip, Swedish football player
Redžep Selman, Olympic triple jumper
Ziya Taner, football manager 
Muarem Zekir, football player

See also 
Turks in North Macedonia
List of Macedonians

References

Macedonian people of Turkish descent
North Macedonia
Turkish